Higino is a given name. Notable people with the name include:

Higino A. Acala Sr. (1925–1968), Filipino lawyer and civil servant
Higino Carneiro (born 1962), Angolan politician

See also
Higino, surname
Higinio